Sui Cheemian, also spelt Sui Chimian, and less commonly as Sui Cheema, is a Cheema village in Punjab, Pakistan. It is a Union council of Gujar Khan Tehsil  (a subdivision of Rawalpindi District). Sui Cheemian gets its name from the Cheema tribe of Jats, who make up the majority of the population. 

The village is located at 33.370427,73.431581 with an altitude of 492 metres (1617 feet).

See also

 Mohra Sandhu

References

Populated places in Gujar Khan Tehsil
Union councils of Gujar Khan Tehsil